Oblapy is a village in Volyn Oblast, located in north-western Ukraine.

History
Oblapy is mentioned as being owned by Andrzej Kurbski upon his death in 1583, it was later owned by the Chołodecki family until 1741 when it was deeded to Józef Rokicki.

Sources
 Słownik geograficzny Królestwa Polskiego i innych krajów słowiańskich, Tom XV cz.2, pg. 397

 
Villages in Kovel Raion